Kim Sang-wook (born 13 June 1964) is a South Korean fencer. He competed in the individual and team sabre events at the 1988 Summer Olympics.

References

External links
 

1964 births
Living people
South Korean male sabre fencers
Olympic fencers of South Korea
Fencers at the 1988 Summer Olympics
Asian Games medalists in fencing
Fencers at the 1986 Asian Games
Fencers at the 1990 Asian Games
Fencers at the 1994 Asian Games
South Korean sabre fencers
Asian Games gold medalists for South Korea
Asian Games silver medalists for South Korea
Asian Games bronze medalists for South Korea
Medalists at the 1986 Asian Games
Medalists at the 1990 Asian Games
Medalists at the 1994 Asian Games